Dança dos Famosos 2017 is the  fourteenth season of the Brazilian reality television show Dança dos Famosos which premiered on August 6, 2017, with the competitive live shows beginning on the following week on August 13, 2017, at 7:30 / 6:30 p.m. (BRT / AMT) on Rede Globo.

On December 17, 2017, actress Maria Joana & Reginaldo Sama won the competition over comedian Lucas Veloso & Nathalia Melo and actor Nicolas Prattes & Mayara Araújo, who took 2nd and 3rd place respectively.

Couples

Elimination chart

Key
 
 
  Eliminated
  Bottom two
  Dance-off
  Withdrew
  Third place
  Runner-up
  Winner

Weekly results

Week 1 

 Presentation of the Celebrities

Aired: August 6, 2017

Week 2 
Week 1 – Women
Style: Disco
Aired: August 13, 2017

Running order

Week 3 
Week 1 – Men
Style: Disco
Aired: August 20, 2017

Running order

Week 4 
Week 2 – Women
Style: Forró
Aired: August 27, 2017

Running order

Week 5 
Week 2 – Men
Style: Forró
Aired: September 3, 2017

Running order

Week 6 
Week 3 – Women
Style: Funk
Aired: September 10, 2017

Running order

Week 7 
Week 3 – Men
Style: Funk
Aired: September 17, 2017

Running order

Week 8 
Week 4 – Women
Style: Rock and Roll
Aired: September 24, 2017

Running order

Week 9 
Week 4 – Men
Style: Rock and Roll
Aired: October 1, 2017

Running order

Week 10 
Week 5 – Women
Style: Country
Aired: October 8, 2017

Running order

Week 11 
Week 5 – Men
Style: Country
Aired: October 15, 2017

Running order

Week 12 
Dance-off
Style: Zouk
Aired: October 22, 2017

Running order

Week 13 
Group 1
Style: Foxtrot
Aired: October 29, 2017

Running order

Week 14 
Group 2
Style: Foxtrot
Aired: November 12, 2017

Running order

Week 15 
Top 7
Style: Salsa
Aired: November 19, 2017

Running order

Week 16 
Top 6
Style: Pasodoble
Aired: November 26, 2017

Running order

Week 17 
Top 5 – Semifinals
Style: Tango
Aired: December 3, 2017

Running order

Week 18 
Top 3 – Finals
Styles: Samba & Waltz
Aired: December 17, 2017

Running order

References

External links
 

2017 Brazilian television seasons
Season 14